The Archdeacon of Hackney is a senior ecclesiastical officer within the Diocese of London. As such, he or she is responsible for the disciplinary supervision of the clergy within its three area deaneries: Hackney, Islington and Tower Hamlets.

The archdeaconry was created from London archdeaconry by Order-in-Council on 2 March 1951; at its erection it consisted of the rural deaneries of Bethnal Green, of Hackney and Stoke Newington, of Islington, of Poplar and of Stepney.

List of archdeacons
19511971 (res.): Michael Hodgins
19711981 (ret.): George Timms (afterwards archdeacon emeritus)
19811992 (res.): Roger Sharpley
19921999 (res.): Clive Young
19992010 (ret.): Lyle Dennen
201115 June 2015 (res.): Rachel Treweek
May 20152016 (acting): Jonathan Brewster
5 April 201613 August 2021 (res.): Liz Adekunle
10 April 2022present: Peter Farley-Moore

References

 
Lists of Anglicans
Lists of English people